O' Higgins is an Irish surname and a sept of the O' Neill family. It may refer to:
O' Higgins clan of Ireland
O' Higgins family Noble family of Sligo and Meath

People of the Surname (Not always related to each other)
Bernard O' Higgins, Bishop of Elphin (1542–64)
Maol Sheachluinn na n-Uirsgéal Ó hUiginn
Michael D. Higgins, ninth and current President of Ireland
Philip Bocht Ó hUiginn
Tadhg Mór Ó hUiginn
Tadg Óg Ó hUiginn
Tadhg Dall Ó hUiginn
William T. O' Higgins (18291874) an Irish-American, Catholic chaplain during the American Civil War.
the following Irish politicians (all related):
Kevin O' Higgins (18921927), Irish politician
Thomas F. O' Higgins (d. 1953), Irish politician
Tom O'Higgins (19162003), Irish politician, barrister, and judge
Michael O' Higgins (19172005), Irish politician
the following Chilean politicians (all related):
Bernardo O' Higgins (17781842), Chilean independence leader 
Ambrosio O'Higgins, 1st Marquess of Osorno (1720?1801), colonial governor of Spanish America; father of Bernardo

See also
O' Higgins (disambiguation)
Higgins (surname)

Surnames of Irish origin